Cañoncito is an unincorporated community in Rio Arriba County, New Mexico, United States.

References

Unincorporated communities in Rio Arriba County, New Mexico
Unincorporated communities in New Mexico